Melted is the third album by American garage rock singer-songwriter Ty Segall. It was released on June 15, 2010 on Goner Records, on CD/LP formats. The songs "My Sunshine" and "Caesar" were officially released as singles, and "Girlfriend" had an official music video.

Critical reception

Melted received acclaim from contemporary music critics. At Metacritic, which assigns a normalized rating out of 100 to reviews from mainstream critics, the album received an average score of 82, based on 6 reviews, which indicates "universal acclaim".

Track listing

Credits
Ty Segall – vocals, guitar, drums, bass, keyboards, percussion, composing, mixing
Tim Hellman – bass on "Melted"
Emily Rose Epstein – drums on "Caesar" and "Imaginary Person"
Jigmae Baer – drums on "Mrs."
Charlie Moonheart – drums on "Girlfriend"
John Dwyer – flute on "Caesar"
King Riff – engineering, mixing
Eric Bauer – composing, engineering
Mike Donovan – vocals on "Mike D's Coke", guitar on "Bees", assistant engineer, composing, mixing
Eric Landmark – mixing
Jason Ward -mastering
William Keihn – artwork
Denée Petracek – photography

References

Ty Segall albums
2010 albums
Goner Records albums